Kernascléden is a commune in the Morbihan department of Brittany in north-western France. Kernascléden is renowned for its church which dates from he fifteenth century. It is a masterpiece of flamboyant gothic architecture.

Geography

Historically, the village belongs to Vannetais. In the center of the village stands the medieval church Notre-Dame de Kernascléden. The village is situated in the valley of the river Scorff. Apart from the village center, there are about twenty hamlets : Brangolo, Kerchopine, Kerbourg, Manéglau, Canquisquelen, Manério, Porh Pimpec, Guernebos, La Maison Blanche, Kerven Cleuzio, Kerven er Lann, Kerihuel, Kerlouarny, Kermaria, Kermonac'h.

Map

History
Scenes of the daily life at the beginning of the twentieth century in Kernascléden.

Kenascléden was created as a new commune in 1955. Before that, it came within the administrative area of the village of Saint-Caradec-Trégomel.

Population
Inhabitants of Kernascléden are called in French Kernascléens or Kernasclédenois.

See also
Communes of the Morbihan department
List of works of the two Folgoët ateliers

References

External links

Official site 

 Mayors of Morbihan Association 

Communes of Morbihan